Bryan Township, Arkansas may refer to:

 Bryan Township, Boone County, Arkansas
 Bryan Township, Greene County, Arkansas
 Bryan Township, Izard County, Arkansas
 Bryan Township, Jackson County, Arkansas
 Bryan Township, Stone County, Arkansas

See also 
 List of townships in Arkansas
 Bryan Township (disambiguation)

Arkansas township disambiguation pages